The 1981 U/Tex Wranglers season was the seventh season of the franchise in the Philippine Basketball Association (PBA).

Colors
Open Conference   (dark)   (light)
Reinforced All-Filipino Conference   (dark)   (light)

Transactions

Summary
Former Boston Celtic Glenn McDonald, who won two titles with U/Tex as their import, became the new head coach of the Wranglers, replacing his former coach Tommy Manotoc, who transferred to San Miguel Beer.

The Wranglers had a pair of 6-5 Francois Wise and 6-9 Darrell Allums as their imports for the Open Conference. U/Tex finish in a tie with San Miguel Beermen on top of the standings after 18 games in the eliminations. Both teams were left out by traditional powerhouses Toyota and Crispa during the semifinal round.  U/Tex placed third by winning their series over the Beermen in five games.

U/Tex lost their first two games in the Reinforced Filipino Conference with John Kazmer as their import, but since the arrival of Leroy Jackson, the Wranglers went on a six-game winning streak and placed third behind Toyota and Crispa at the end of the elimination phase. The Wranglers continued its winning run in the round of six and was the first team to land one of the two finals berth during the semifinal round.  

U/Tex and Crispa played in the PBA finals for the third time in the last five years. The Wranglers lost to the Redmanizers in four games in their best-of-five title series.

Won-loss record vs opponents

Awards
William "Bogs" Adornado received his third MVP plum, becoming the PBA's first three-time Most Valuable Player Awardee. Adornado won his first two during the league's first two seasons in 1975–1976 while playing for Crispa Redmanizers.

Roster

References

U-Tex Wranglers seasons
U-Tex